Jorabs  are multicolored socks with intricate patterns, knitted from the toe-up. They are usually worn in such a way as to display rich decoration.

Etymology 

The word "Jorabs" originates from Arabic جورب which has a general meaning of "socks". Other known variants of the term are “çorap" (Turkish), "чорап" (Bulgarian, Macedonian) "čarape" (Serbian), “corab" (Azerbaijani), "čarapa" (Bosnian), “Ҷӯроб" (Tajik), and "şətəl" (Tat). 

The same concept is also known by such local terms as “kyulyutar” in Lezgin, “”  in Tsakhur, and “unq’al” in Avar languages of Dagestan.

Materials 

Jorabs are made of wool, silk, nylon or sometimes cotton. Other materials include acrylic and blends of wool and cotton.

Geography 

Jorabs are found in Central Asia (Turkmenistan, Tajikistan, and Afghanistan), Caucasus (Dagestan, Georgia, Azerbaijan, and Armenia); also in Iran, and mountain areas of Pakistan. They are also known in the Balkan countries: Albania, Bosnia, Bulgaria, Greece, Macedonia, Serbia, and Turkey.

Shape 

Jorabs can be knee-high, regular length, ankle-length, or made as slippers. An early predecessor of jorabs, a knee-high 12th century sock with toe-up construction and intricate patterns, was found in Egypt with possible origin in India.

Tools 

Jorabs are usually knitted with 5 double-pointed needles. Bosnian and in old Tajik socks feature a combination of knitting and crochet techniques. Tajik jorabs (Pamirs area) can be made by using crochet technique only. Some ethnic groups from the Caucasus knit jorabs with 3 double-pointed bow-shaped needles.

References

Books 

  (LibraryThing page.)
 
 
 

Socks
Hosiery
Folk footwear
History of clothing
Knitting